The Columbia Center is a pair of twin towers on Big Beaver Road in Troy, Michigan. Both buildings were designed by Minoru Yamasaki & Associates, designers of One Woodward Avenue and the now-destroyed World Trade Center.  Both buildings stand 14 floors and are 193 ft (59m) tall.

At one time Northwest Airlines had a ticket office in Suite 115 of the complex.

Columbia Center East 
Columbia Center East is located at 101 W. Big Beaver Road. The building was constructed in 1998, and finished in 2000. It stands at 15 floors in height, with 14 above-ground floors, and 1 basement floor. The high-rise is used as offices for a number of local and regional businesses.

The building was designed in the modern architectural style, and uses mainly brick and glass.

Columbia Center West 
Columbia Center West is located at 201 W. Big Beaver Road. The building was built in 1989, and has the same number of floors and basements as its younger twin. The high-rise is used for offices, restaurants, retail, and includes a fitness center.

Like Columbia Center East, it was designed in the architectural style, and uses mainly brick and glass.

References

External links 

 
 
 
 

Skyscrapers in Troy, Michigan
Skyscraper office buildings in Michigan
Office buildings completed in 2000
2000 establishments in Michigan
Minoru Yamasaki buildings